Football of the Good Old Days is a 1973 Hungarian comedy film directed by Pál Sándor.

Cast 
 Dezső Garas - Ede Minarik, mosodás
 Tamás Major - Kerényi úr
 László Márkus - Pipi Turner
 Hédi Temessy - Cserépkalapos nő
 Cecília Esztergályos - Ila, a bundás nő
 Ildikó Szabó - Vajaskenyeres lány 
 Gizi Péter - Minárikné, Aranka
 András Kern - Kövesdi, tartalék

References

External links 

1973 comedy films
1973 films
Hungarian comedy films
1970s Hungarian-language films